The Mon Unity Party (MUP) is a political party in Myanmar (Burma). The party was formed from a merger of the All Mon Region Democracy Party and the Mon National Party. It has nearly 100,000 members and branch offices in Yangon, Kayin State, Tanintharyi, and Bago.

History 
In December 2018, leaders of the All Mon Region Democracy Party and Mon National Party, as well as other interested Mon politicians, submitted a petition to Myanmar's election commission to form a new party, the Mon Unity Party. The Mon Unity Party was officially registered on 11 July 2019.

Party structure 
The Mon Unity Party has 140 members on its central committee, including 59 members of the Central Executive Committee, four chairmen, and six secretariats.

References

Political parties in Myanmar
Political parties established in 2010
2010 establishments in Myanmar
Mon State